Building Wild is a reality construction series. It premiered on National Geographic Channel on January 14, 2014. The network's first-ever "do-it-yourself" series, Building Wild features the work of Paul DiMeo and Pat "Tuffy" Bakatis, collectively known as The Cabin Kings. Each week on the series, The Cabin Kings meet a new client who dreams of a backwoods getaway. In seven days or less, The Cabin Kings build their clients a custom cabin; the landowners must provide some materials and manpower in order to get the job done before the deadline. The cabins featured on the series each included an unexpected design element: a cabin that rotates 360 degrees, a cabin that floats, a cabin with a winch elevator (Tuffy-vator), or a bus converted into living space. Promoted by the network as "The most rugged construction series ever built," all episodes were filmed in the area surrounding Hoosick Falls, NY. The show was created by and is executive produced by George Verschoor and William Spjut.

Its second and final season premiered on February 24, 2015, and ended on April 21, 2015.

Series Format

Paul DiMeo (frequently referred to as "Paulie" on the series) spent nine seasons as a designer on ABC's Extreme Makeover: Home Edition. Partner Pat "Tuffy" Bakaitis is a master fabricator from rural New York. Together, they are The Cabin Kings, a construction "Odd Couple" that specializes in dream off-the-grid getaways. In each episode, The Cabin Kings meet a new client with a dream of a backwoods retreat. The Cabin Kings agree to provide a design and the know-how to get the cabin built in seven days or less. The clients must pitch in materials that can be repurposed as part of the build and manpower in the form of friends and relatives willing to lend a hand. Each episode becomes a race against the clock, as The Cabin Kings often must first build a road to access the remote building sites. Toward the end of each build, the landowner is sent away while the Cabin Kings make finishing touches on the cabin, so that each episode can culminate in a dramatic "reveal" with that week's clients seeing his or her newly built cabin for the first time.

Repurposing

Each client must contribute materials that can be recycled into the new cabin's design; this "repurposing" became a fan-favorite element of the series, and often provided dramatic or humorous reveals.  A reclaimed tractor cab became an outhouse. An 800-gallon milk tank helped turn a dairy operation into a new microbrewery.  A vintage camper is lifted into the trees to become a treetop guest house.

Episodes

Season One

Season Two

References

Do it yourself
Home renovation television series
2014 American television series debuts
National Geographic (American TV channel) original programming